Abdennour Bidar (born 13 January 1971) is a French writer and philosopher of Islamic culture.

Author of several books and many articles, he came to public attention in the aftermath of the Charlie Hebdo shooting, when he wrote an "Open Letter to the Muslim World".

He works for the French Ministry of National Education. In 2015, due to the death of Abdelwahab Meddeb, he is named responsible of the programme "Cultures d'islam" (English: "Cultures of Islam") on the public radio France Culture.

Notes and references

Bibliography 
 Mohammed Hashas, "Reading Abdennour Bidar: New Pathways for European Islamic Thought," Journal of Muslims in Europe, Volume 2, Issue 1, 2013, pages 45 – 76, at: books and Journal Brill online
 Mohammed Hashas, "Abdennour Bidar: self Islam, Islamic existentialism, and overcoming religion," in The Idea of European Islam: Religion, Ethics, Politics and Perpetual Modernity at  Routlegde.com (London and New York: Routledge, 2019)Chapter four, pp. 140-162.

See also 
 Islamic Modernism

External links 
 

1971 births
Living people
ENS Fontenay-Saint-Cloud-Lyon alumni
21st-century French writers
21st-century French philosophers
Writers from Clermont-Ferrand
French scholars of Islam
French people of Moroccan descent
Radio France people
French male non-fiction writers